Horden Athletic F.C. was an English association football club which participated in the Wearside Football League and the FA Cup.

References

Defunct football clubs in England
Defunct football clubs in County Durham